The 1972 Campeonato Ecuatoriano de Fútbol Serie A, the first division of Ecuadorian football (soccer), was played by 16 teams. The champion was Emelec.

First stage

Second stage

Liguilla Final

Relegation play-off

External links
 Ecuador 1972 

1972
Ecu
Football